Meliti (before 1926: Βοστεράνη - Vosterani;) is a village in the Florina regional unit, Western Macedonia, Greece, 15 km northeast of the city of Florina. It is part of the municipal unit Meliti.

Name
The name of the village is "Voshterani", "Voštarani" (Воштарани, Вощарани) or "Ovčarani" (Овчарани) in both Macedonian and Bulgarian. The village was called Türbeli during the Ottoman Empire. In 1926, it was renamed to "Meliti" in Greek.

History
The village was first mentioned in an Ottoman defter of 1481, where it was listed under the name Voštarani and described as having one hundred and ninety-eight households. During the Ottoman period, the village had a mixed Bulgarian and Turkish population. In 1845 the Russian slavist Victor Grigorovich recorded Vushtarani (Вуштарани) as mainly Bulgarian village. A Bulgarian school stood in the village at the beginning of 20th century.

After the Balkan Wars, Greece annexed the village. In World War I, Bulgaria occupied it, but with Treaty of Neuilly-sur-Seine it was returned to Greece. After the Greco-Turkish War (1919–1922), the Turkish population left the village and Greek refugees from Anatolia were settled there. The village mosque was destroyed and its minaret demolished. A Muslim türbe (burial monument) on a hill above the village was destroyed.

After the defeat of Greece by Nazi Germany in April 1941, a local government was established and villagers were actively involved in the pro-Bulgarian organization "Ohrana." In 1946, 20 activists from "Ohrana", were sentenced to prison by a court in Florina. During the Greek Civil War, about 200 villagers joined the Communist-led Democratic Army of Greece. After the Greek Civil War, 66 Slavic Macedonian and 12 Pontic families left the village.

In 2008, a group of roughly 30 villagers from Meliti joined in protest with fellow slavic Macedonians from Lofoi and Kella to protest the presence of the Greek military conducting training exercises in the vicinity of these villages.

Culture
Meliti holds an annual festival in honour of the Prophet Elijah. Held every year on 19–20 July, it is known as "Ilinden" in the local dialect, and is considered by some Slavic Macedonians living in the village to be a celebration in honour of the Ilinden Uprising. The festival has attracted performers from the neighbouring Republic of North Macedonia such as Vaska Ilieva, Suzana Spasovska, Elena Velevska, Synthesis and the Tanec folklore ensemble. An estimated 3,000–5,000 people attend the event every year.

The festival however has not gone without criticism from the Greek authorities and local Greek media. In the past, as was common with all festivals involving songs in Slavic Macedonian, there were suppressive measures enforced by local authorities. According to the president of the local community, this was so severe that it was only until 1983 that songs in the Slavic Macedonian language were allowed to be sung. In 1988 the local police interrupted the festival to by switching off all power to the sound system, a reaction to the singing of Slavic Macedonian songs. The police later justified these actions claiming that the mayor of the village had been warned not to use the Slavic Macedonian names of songs, but to instead use the Greek version. Two years later the police employed similar tactics in response to a folkloric group singing in Slavic Macedonian. Some Greek media has perceived the festival to constitute a threat alleging that the festival represents a "rebellion against Greek sovereignty". Within the Slavic Macedonian media however, an alternate approach has been taken, with the event being publicised as the largest annual gathering of Slavic Macedonians in Greece.

The village is home to both Slavic Macedonian and Pontic Greek folkloric groups, with the Macedonian group "KUD Ovčarani" notably performing at the 40th "Macedonian Border Festival" at the border village of Trnovo, North Macedonia.

Demographics
The Greek census (1920) recorded 1292 people in the village and in 1923 there were 370 inhabitants (or 90 families) who were Muslim. Following the Greek-Turkish population exchange, in 1926 within Vosterani there were refugee families from East Thrace (2), Asia Minor (10), Pontus (24), the Caucasus (20) and one other from an unidentified location. The Greek census (1928) recorded 1388 village inhabitants. There were 55 refugee families (211 people) in 1928.

Meliti had 1511 inhabitants in 1981. In fieldwork done by Riki Van Boeschoten in late 1993, Meliti was populated by Slavophones and a Greek population descended from Anatolian Greek refugees who arrived during the population exchange. The Macedonian language was used by people of all ages, both in public and private settings, and as the main language for interpersonal relationships. Some elderly villagers had little knowledge of Greek. Pontic Greek was spoken by people over 60, mainly in private.

In the mid 2000s, the village has been described as the "epicenter of Macedonian ethnic activism in Greece". 

According to the 2011 census, the population of Meliti was 1,432 people.

Economy 
 Florina Power Station, a lignite-fired power station.

References

Populated places in Florina (regional unit)